The men's basketball tournament at the 2015 Pan American Games was held in Toronto, Canada at the Ryerson Athletic Centre from July 21 to 25.

For these Games, the men competed in an 8-team tournament. The teams were grouped into two pools of four teams each for a round-robin preliminary round. The top two teams in each group will advance to a single elimination bracket.

Puerto Rico are the defending champions from the 2011 Pan American Games in Guadalajara, defeating Mexico, 74–72 in the final.

The official detailed schedule for the tournament was announced on February 5, 2015.

Qualification
A total of eight men's teams qualified to compete at the games. The top three teams at the South American and Central American and Caribbean Championships will qualify for each respective tournament. The host nation (Canada) along with the United States automatically qualified a teams for the event.

Summary

Draw
Pots one through three were based on the each teams finish at their respective qualification tournament. Pot 1 consisted of the champions, pot 2 the runners-up and pot 3 contained the third placed teas. Pot 4 contained the host nation, Canada and the United States. Teams were placed into groups using a random draw (with each group receiving one team per pot). The draw was held in San Juan, Puerto Rico on December 16, 2014. Canada as host nation were able to select their group after the first three pots were drawn. This automatically placed the United States into the group Canada did not select.

Latest FIBA World Rankings (September 2014) per team is shown in brackets.

Rosters

At the start of tournament, all eight participating countries had up to 12 players on their rosters.

Results

All times are Eastern Daylight Time (UTC−4)

Preliminary round

Group A

Group B

Classification round

Seventh place match

Fifth place match

Knockout round

Semifinals

Bronze medal match

Gold medal match

Final standings

References

External links
 Official men's tournament website

 
Men's tournament